Singarkone is a village in Kalna II CD block in Kalna subdivision of Purba Bardhaman district in the state of West Bengal, India.

Geography

Location
Singarkone is located at

CD block HQ
The headquarters of Kalna II CD block are located at Singarkone.

Urbanisation
87.00% of the population of Kalna subdivision lives in the rural areas. Only 13.00% of the population lives in the urban areas. The map alongside presents some of the notable locations in the subdivision. All places marked in the map are linked in the larger full screen map.

Demographics
As per the 2011 Census of India Singarkon had a total population of 3,485, of which 1,784 (51%) were males and 1,701 (49%) were females. Population below 6 years was 331. The total number of literates in Singarkon was 2,514 (79.71% of the population over 6 years).

Market
According to local information, Bengali poet Jatindranath Sengupta was born in his maternal uncle’s ancestral home at Patilpara village, located nearby, on 26 June 1887. Although he belonged to Santipur, he spent a lot of his time in the area. He had penned a piece about the Singarkone market. The state government is developing the market in his memory.

Transport
Kalna-Boinchee Road passes through Singarkone.

Culture
Baidyapur Jora Deul, a monument of national importance, is located nearby.

Healthcare
Badla block primary health centre at Badla is located nearby.

References

Villages in Purba Bardhaman district